Heneage Finch, 4th Earl of Aylesford, PC, FRS, FSA (4 July 1751 – 21 October 1812), styled Lord Guernsey between 1757 and 1777, was a British  politician who sat in the House of Commons from 1772 to 1777 when he succeeded to a peerage.  He was also a landscape artist.

Background and education
Aylesford was the son of Heneage Finch, 3rd Earl of Aylesford, and Lady Charlotte Finch, daughter of Charles Seymour, 6th Duke of Somerset. He was born at his paternal grandfather's residence, Syon House, near London. He was educated at Christ Church, Oxford.

Political career
Aylesford was returned to parliament for Castle Rising in 1772, a seat he held until 1774,  and then represented Maidstone until 1777,when he succeeded his father in the earldom and entered the House of Lords. He was a Lord of the Bedchamber to George III between 1777 and 1783.  The latter year he was sworn of the Privy Council and appointed Captain of the Yeomen of the Guard by William Pitt the Younger. He retained this office until 1804, the last three years under the premiership of Henry Addington. When Pitt resumed office in 1804, Aylesford was made Lord Steward of the Household. He continued in this office until his death in 1812, under successively Lord Grenville, the Duke of Portland and Spencer Perceval.

Aylesford also held the honorary position of High Steward of Sutton Coldfield from 1796 until his death.

Artistic career
Apart from his political career Lord Aylesford was an artist of some repute in the British landscape tradition.  Tate Britain has 50 watercolours, drawings and prints by Finch in its collection.  In 1795 an Album of Etchings by Lord Aylesford and Others was published.  A. P. Oppe wrote an article giving some background and listing 85 of Aylesford's etchings titled The Fourth Earl of Aylesford. The Print Collector's Quarterly 1924, Vol 11, p. 263. Lord Aylesford was elected a Fellow of the Royal Society in 1773 and was a trustee of the British Museum between 1787 and 1812.

Family

Lord Aylesford married Lady Louisa Thynne, daughter of Thomas Thynne, 1st Marquess of Bath, on 18 November 1781. They lived at Packington Hall near Meriden, Warwickshire and had thirteen children:

 Heneage Charles Finch, Lord Guernsey (27 February 1784 – 18 July 1784)
 Lady Charlotte Finch (31 January 1785 – 17 January 1869), married Charles Palmer on 22 January 1823.
Heneage Finch, 5th Earl of Aylesford (24 April 1786 – 1859)
 Hon. Daniel Finch (25 February 1789 – 17 January 1868), artist.
 Lady Frances Finch (c. 1791 – 12 July 1886), unmarried
 Hon. Edward Finch (1792 – 9 April 1830)
 Lieutenant-General the Hon. John Finch (1793 – 25 November 1861), married in 1835 Katherine Ellice (d. 1872)
 Hon. Henry Finch (1795–1829)
 Hon. Charles Finch (b. 1799)
 Hon. Charles and Lady Caroline (buried Jan 27 1797) <ref> Warwickshire C of E Register of Baptisms, Marriages, and Burials
 Lady Mary Finch (d. 24 July 1823)
 Lady Elizabeth Finch (d. 1 June 1879)
 Lady Henrietta Finch (d. 1828)
 Lady Caroline Finch (d. 1821)

Lord Aylesford died at Great Packington, Warwickshire, in October 1812, aged 61, from gout in the stomach. He was succeeded by his eldest surviving son, Heneage. The Countess of Aylesford died in December 1832, aged 72.

Legacy 
 namesake of Aylesford, Nova Scotia

External links

Works by Lord Aylesford at tate.org.uk
Lord Aylesford at artcyclopedia.com
A catalog of etchings by Lord Aylesford

References

1751 births
1812 deaths
Alumni of Christ Church, Oxford
Guernsey, Heneage Finch, Lord
Guernsey, Heneage Finch, Lord
18th-century British painters
British male painters
4
Fellows of the Royal Society
Guernsey, Heneage Finch, Lord
Members of the Privy Council of Great Britain
Heneage
Trustees of the British Museum
British printmakers